is a steel roller coaster located at Nagashima Spa Land amusement park in Mie Prefecture, Japan.

Built by D. H. Morgan Manufacturing, Steel Dragon opened to the public on August 1, 2000. It takes its name from Chinese astrology and zodiac calendars in which the year 2000 represents the dragon.

History
In November 1999, Nagashima Spa Land announced that they would be building Steel Dragon 2000. It would be the second giga coaster to be built, following Millennium Force at Cedar Point. 

Steel Dragon 2000 officially opened to the general public on August 1, 2000.

The ride originally featured trains built by Morgan. In 2013, Steel Dragon 2000 received new trains from Bolliger & Mabillard.

Layout
Out of the station, the track makes a right hand turn onto the lift hill. Due to the length of the lift hill, it utilizes two chains with separate motors. Following the second helix, the track maneuvers through the supports of the first helix and third hill and makes a left turn into the midcourse brakes, which start the return trip.

The return trip consists of a series of airtime hills, running parallel to the outbound track, before hitting the final brake run next to the base of the lift hill. From the brake run, trains pass through the transfer track and storage area before making a sweeping left turn to return to the station.

Design 
 The building of Steel Dragon 2000 required far more steel than other coasters for earthquake protection. This put the cost of the coaster at over US$50 million.
 The ride includes two tunnels.

Records 
It is behind Kingda Ka, Top Thrill Dragster, Red Force and Fury 325.
 World's longest roller coaster since August 2000.

Incident 
On August 23, 2003, a sheared axle caused one of the trains to lose a wheel. A passenger suffered a serious back injury and a 28-year-old man swimming in the water park pool was injured when he was hit in the hip with the  wheel. The ride was closed for over three years and reopened on September 3, 2006.

Awards

References 

Roller coasters introduced in 2000
Roller coasters in Japan